Véronique Dugailly (born 1 August 1967) is a Belgian alpine skier. She competed in two events at the 1994 Winter Olympics.

References

External links
 

1967 births
Living people
Belgian female alpine skiers
Olympic alpine skiers of Belgium
Alpine skiers at the 1994 Winter Olympics
People from Uccle
Sportspeople from Brussels
20th-century Belgian women